Tillandsia zoquensis is a species of flowering plant in the family Bromeliaceae, endemic to southeastern Mexico. It was first described by Renate Ehlers in 2002.

References

zoquensis
Endemic flora of Mexico